Scotia, formerly known as Forestville until 1888, is a census-designated place in Humboldt County, California. Scotia has a population of 850 (2010 census).

Scotia is a company town founded by the Pacific Lumber Company (PALCO) to house workers for the lumber industry. The town was entirely owned by PALCO until 2008, following the corporation's declaration of bankruptcy. While it is home to hundreds of past or present lumber mill employees and their dependents, a process is underway to divide the homes into lots for sale.

History

Scotia was founded in 1863 as Forestville by the Pacific Lumber Company to house workers for its lumber industry operations in the area. The town was formed following the winter flood of 1861–1862; that flood level was not observed again until 1955.  The Eel River crested at a gauge height of 72 feet (10.1 feet higher than 1955) on December 23, 1964. Eighteen-million board feet of redwood logs and 23-million board feet of lumber were washed out of the Scotia sawmill and scattered along the lower river and Pacific coast to the mouth of the Columbia River.

The Humboldt Bay and Eel River Railroad connected the town to Humboldt Bay in 1885. This railway became part of Atchison, Topeka and Santa Fe Railway subsidiary San Francisco and Northwestern Railway in 1903, and was linked to the national rail network by completion of the Northwestern Pacific Railroad in 1914.

Forestville was renamed 25 years later in 1888 to prevent confusion with a community in Sonoma County of the same name. It is said that the new name was chosen because it was populated by many residents originated from New Brunswick and Nova Scotia (Canada), and that the name Scotia was chosen by a coin toss, with the alternative being Brunswick. The first post office in the town opened the same year.

Life in early 20th century Scotia is documented by the Neill Photo Albums, which feature 292 photographs of the Neill family, townspeople, and daily life in the company town. Images reflect everyday life and hardships, local residents and homes, vacations, trips into the surrounding forest, and Pacific Lumber Company's mill and work operations, between the years of 1908 and 1913. The Neil Photo Album is available for viewing at Humboldt State University's Special Collections. During the mid-to-late 19th century, Scotia was one of numerous company towns established across the Pacific Northwest, many of which closed down during the Great Depression in the 1930s. Scotia was one of the handful of company towns to survive this period and further into the 20th century, and most of the existing houses were built between the 1920s and 1950s.

The 1992 Cape Mendocino earthquakes caused widespread damage in Humboldt County, including Scotia, when three major earthquakes in less than a 24-hour span. The first was a magnitude 7.2 quake at 11:06 a.m. on April 25, causing mill damage that took months to repair. The second quake, a 6.5, at 12:41 a.m. on April 26, caused the most damage. A fire started in the Hoby's Market shopping center exploded, with firefighters trying to extinguish the fire the rest of the night, but the entire shopping center was destroyed. The earthquake also caused extensive damage to the North Court area of Scotia, with numerous homes damaged and gas leakages from a damaged gas line. Pacific Gas & Electric responded to repair the gas line in North Court while all the residents were gathered on a grassy hill for the entire night. The third quake at 4:26 a.m. on April 26, measuring 6.7, compounded damage from the previous two quakes. Scotia was temporarily without water and electricity, and PALCO rebuilt the shopping center that had been destroyed.

PALCO bankruptcy
PALCO announced in 2006 a desire to sell the homes (to the employees and retirees who currently live there) and commercial property. The company suggested that Scotia become part of Rio Dell, a small neighboring town located directly across the Eel River.  Additionally, the need for employees had fallen from over 1,000 to around 300, in part due to a lack of logs and also from automation. On January 18, 2007, PALCO filed for bankruptcy protection under Chapter 11, Title 11, United States Code.  On July 8, 2008, the court issued its judgment and order confirming the Plan of Reorganization submitted by secured creditor Marathon Structured Finance Fund (Marathon), joined by Mendocino Redwood Company (MRC). Pursuant to that plan, most of the Town of Scotia's real and personal assets transferred to a reorganized entity wholly owned by Marathon, Town of Scotia Company, LLC (TOS). Under the plan, the active Scotia sawmill facilities and other ancillary office buildings will transfer to a second reorganized entity, Humboldt Redwood Company (HRC) in which Marathon and MRC both have interests (United States Bankruptcy Court for the Southern District of Texas, Corpus Christi Division as "Case No. 07-20027-C-11" under the consolidated title, In Re Scotia Development LLC, et al., Debtors.) The Town of Scotia LLC has pursued a General Plan Amendment/ Zone Reclassification and Final Map Subdivision application.  Subdivision requires fulfillment of conditions of approval which include formation of a community services district or other public entity to manage utilities.  Service district formation requires approval by the Humboldt County Local Agency Formation Commission, which has a pending application.  The purpose of the subdivision is to create individual parcels for existing residential and commercial properties, and public facilities. The proposed subdivision would allow for the sale of residential and commercial lots (all of which are currently owned and operated by the Town of Scotia LLC) to individual property owners.

Infrastructure
Offerings includes the following: a movie theater, a museum and a hotel with the town's only bar and restaurant, a new shopping center, a school through eighth grade, a community recreation center, a baseball field and two churches. PALCO operates the town on a one million dollar annual budget. Available housing consists of 274 two-to-four-bedroom wood-frame cottages. The 28 person volunteer fire department is fully funded by PALCO.

PALCO's infrastructure in town also included the electrical distribution system. The Scotia distribution system was the very last one in the state to use color-coded crossarms on the utility system. Red arms are for low-voltage service to the houses and buildings, yellow arms are for 2400-volt primary distribution, and blue designates the Pacific Gas & Electric interconnection. As part of the process of subdividing the town, PG&E has constructed a new distribution system (built to the California PUC's current specifications) to serve those portions of the town no longer under the company's control.

Demographics

2010
The 2010 United States Census reported that Scotia had a population of 850. The racial makeup of Scotia was 674 (79.3%) White, 3 (0.4%) African American, 35 (4.1%) Native American, 3 (0.4%) Asian, 9 (1.1%) Pacific Islander, 90 (10.6%) from other races, and 36 (4.2%) from two or more races. Hispanic or Latino of any race were 150 persons (17.6%).

The Census reported that 848 people (99.8% of the population) lived in households, 2 (0.2%) lived in non-institutionalized group quarters, and 0 (0%) were institutionalized.

There were 265 households, out of which 161 (60.8%) had children under the age of 18 living in them, 140 (52.8%) were heterosexual married couples living together, 42 (15.8%) had a female householder with no husband present, 30 (11.3%) had a male householder with no wife present.  There were 41 (15.5%) unmarried heterosexual partnerships, and 2 (0.8%) homosexual married couples or partnerships. 35 households (13.2%) were made up of individuals, and 4 (1.5%) had someone living alone who was 65 years of age or older. The average household size was 3.20.  There were 212 families (80.0% of all households); the average family size was 3.44.

The population was spread out, with 322 people (37.9%) under the age of 18, 84 people (9.9%) aged 18 to 24, 277 people (32.6%) aged 25 to 44, 144 people (16.9%) aged 45 to 64, and 23 people (2.7%) who were 65 years of age or older.  The median age was 26.0 years. For every 100 females, there were 104.8 males.  For every 100 females age 18 and over, there were 103.1 males.

The homeowner vacancy rate was 0%; the rental vacancy rate was 1.5%.  0 people (0% of the population) lived in owner-occupied housing units and 848 people (99.8%) lived in rental housing units.

Visitor attractions

The Scotia Museum contains artifacts, photographs, and exhibits.  The Fisheries Center allows visitors to view various types of the area's native fish and experience a setting that is remarkably similar to their natural environment.

The Winema Theater built in 1919 according to designs by Alfred Henry Jacobs. Its design evokes a Tyrolean Swiss chalet with exposed wooden beams and the structure was built with redwood.

Appearances in popular culture
Scotia is featured in California's Gold Episode 7002 with Huell Howser.

Politics

Climate
Scotia has a warm-summer Mediterranean climate (Csb) according to the Köppen climate classification system. It was a full  warmer than the previous all-time record.

Scotia has not had an ice day since records began in 1926 with the lowest daily maximum being  in 1990. The moderate and foggy Pacific summer air cools down the nights in that season.

Plane crash
On June 19, 1977, a Rockwell Commander plane piloted by Norman Wascher crashed in woods near Scotia, not long after takeoff from Murray Field in Eureka, bound for Oxnard. His wife, Beverly, was the only other person on board. The plane was not found until 1996, nineteen years later, and the couple's bodies were not found until 2005, 28 years after the incident. Robin Lee Wascher, one of the couple's three daughters, was the air traffic controller on duty during the Los Angeles runway disaster in 1991.

See also

 Northwestern Pacific Railroad
 Scotia, New York

References

External links

 

Census-designated places in Humboldt County, California
Company towns in California
Logging communities in the United States
Populated places established in 1863
Census-designated places in California
Pacific Lumber Company
1863 establishments in California